Repetobasidium is a genus of fungi in the Hymenochaetales. It was circumscribed by Swedish mycologist John Eriksson in 1958.

Species
Repetobasidium americanum
Repetobasidium canadense
Repetobasidium conicum
Repetobasidium erikssonii
Repetobasidium glaucocanum
Repetobasidium hastatum
Repetobasidium intermedium
Repetobasidium macrosporum
Repetobasidium mirificum
Repetobasidium vestitum
Repetobasidium vile

References

Repetobasidiaceae
Agaricomycetes genera
Taxa described in 1958